Peterson is a city in Fillmore County, Minnesota, United States. The population was 199 at the 2010 census.

History
In the year 1853, Peter Peterson Haslerud purchased and platted the village site of Peterson and was the major force behind its early growth and development. The community was named after him. After buying the land and platting the town, he was elected to the Minnesota State Legislature, served in several appointed positions and in 1856 was appointed by the Governor of Minnesota as Immigration officer for the 14th District of Minnesota. Peter was instrumental in bringing the railroad through Rushford Township in 1867 and he gave the railroad company fifteen acres of land and along with other citizens contributed $800. to secure a station and warehouse at Peterson. Peter began buying wheat from local farmers and shipping it back to the eastern part of the U.S.

In 1870, a post office was established in Peterson and Even A. Hjelie was appointed first postmaster.  In 1871, Peter Peterson Haslerud developed a "trout farm" on his property outside Peterson and continued to expand the boundaries of the town.

In 1873, Ole Ensberg started a blacksmith shop and in 1874 an additional quarter section of land was laid out into lots and added to the village of Peterson.  In 1875, two general stores, a hardware store, and a drug store were established.  In 1875, the telegraph was installed at the railroad station and G.P. Haslerud (Peter Peterson Haslerud's oldest son) was appointed agent.  Also in that year fifteen additional acres were platted and Prospect Park, Mill, Centennial, Fillmore, Church, and Myrtle Streets were named.  In 1876, a mill was built with farmers living in the surrounding areas subscribing most of the stock.  A livery barn, a steam mill,  the Peterson Hotel, the Northwestern Bar and other small businesses opened for business.

In 1882, the Minnesota and Dakota Gazetteer, gave a contemporary  description of Peterson:

"An unincorporated village of 100 inhabitants in Rushford Township, northeastern part of Fillmore County, and a station on the Southern Minnesota Railroad, 25 miles from Preston and 120 miles from Minneapolis.  It is situated on the Root Rover which furnishes power to a flour mill at this point.  A steam flour mill is also in operation in the village and there is a Lutheran church and district school.  The exports are flour and wheat.  Modes of communication are: Western Union Telegraph, American Express, two stages semi-weekly from Pilot Mound to Peterson via Arendahl and daily mail service."

Peterson was organized as a village in 1909.

Geography

Demographics

2010 census
As of the census of 2010, there were 199 people, 97 households, and 60 families residing in the city. The racial makeup of the city was 99.5% White and 0.5% Native American. Hispanic or Latino of any race were 1.0% of the population.

There were 97 households, of which 19.6% had children under the age of 18 living with them, 51.5% were married couples living together, 8.2% had a female householder with no husband present, 2.1% had a male householder with no wife present, and 38.1% were non-families. 35.1% of all households were made up of individuals, and 16.5% had someone living alone who was 65 years of age or older. The average household size was 2.05 and the average family size was 2.63.

The median age in the city was 50.4 years. 16.6% of residents were under the age of 18; 6.9% were between the ages of 18 and 24; 19% were from 25 to 44; 32.1% were from 45 to 64; and 25.1% were 65 years of age or older. The gender makeup of the city was 49.7% male and 50.3% female.

2000 census
As of the census of 2000, there were 269 people, 98 households, and 65 families residing in the city. The racial makeup of the city was 99.63% White and 0.37% Asian. Hispanic or Latino of any race were 0.74% of the population.

There were 98 households, out of which 21.4% had children under the age of 18 living with them, 57.1% were married couples living together, 7.1% had a female householder with no husband present, and 32.7% were non-families. 29.6% of all households were made up of individuals, and 14.3% had someone living alone who was 65 years of age or older.  The average household size was 2.33 and the average family size was 2.83.

In the city, the population was spread out, with 19.0% under the age of 18, 6.3% from 18 to 24, 19.7% from 25 to 44, 23.4% from 45 to 64, and 31.6% who were 65 years of age or older.  The median age was 48 years. For every 100 females, there were 96.4 males.  For every 100 females age 18 and over, there were 100.0 males.

The median income for a household in the city was $35,781, and the median income for a family was $43,333. Males had a median income of $29,167 versus $22,708 for females. The per capita income for the city was $14,728.  About 12.1% of families and 12.4% of the population were below the poverty line, including 20.0% of those under the age of eighteen and 7.5% of those 65 or over.

Parks and recreation
Peterson is one of several towns intersected by the Root River segment of the Blufflands State Trail.

References

External links
 
 City of Peterson Minnesota
 Rushford Peterson Valley
 Rushford-Peterson Schools
 City-Data.com
 ePodunk: Profile for Peterson, Minnesota

Cities in Fillmore County, Minnesota
Cities in Minnesota